August George "Gus" Desch (December 12, 1898 – November 1964) was an American track and field athlete who competed mainly in the 400 metre hurdles. He was born in Newark, New Jersey and died in Evanston, Illinois.

Desch competed for the United States in the 1920 Summer Olympics held in Antwerp, Belgium in the 400 metre hurdles where he won the bronze medal. Desch also played half back for Knute Rockne at the University of Notre Dame. He won Notre Dame's first ever track title when he won the 220-yard low hurdles at the 1921 Outdoor NCAA Track Championships.

References

External links 
 Olympic competitions at Databaseolympics

Athletes (track and field) at the 1920 Summer Olympics
Olympic bronze medalists for the United States in track and field
1898 births
1964 deaths
Players of American football from Newark, New Jersey
Track and field athletes from Newark, New Jersey
Notre Dame Fighting Irish men's track and field athletes
Notre Dame Fighting Irish football players
Medalists at the 1920 Summer Olympics
American male hurdlers